The 1909 Nebraska Cornhuskers football team represented the University of Nebraska as a member of the Missouri Valley Conference (MVC) during the 1909 college football season. The team was coached by third-year head coach William C. "King" Cole and played its home games at Nebraska Field in Lincoln, Nebraska.

Prior to the start of the 1909 season, the university constructed Nebraska Field, located on campus adjacent to where Memorial Stadium was later built. It replaced Antelope Field, where NU had played its home games since 1897.

Schedule

Coaching staff

Roster

Game summaries

South Dakota

Sources:

Knox

Sources:

This was the final meeting between Knox and Nebraska.

Minnesota

Sources:

After seven consecutive games in Minneapolis, Minnesota and Nebraska faced off in Nebraska for a second time.

Iowa

Sources:

After two Iowa field goals, Nebraska recovered its own fumble in the end zone, and the game ended in a 6–6 tie.

Doane

Sources:

Kansas

Sources:

Two 15-yard Nebraska penalties late in the game led to a game-winning punt return touchdown by Kansas.

at Denver

Sources:

Nebraska scored its only touchdown off a muffed Denver kick return, and held on for a 6–5 win.

Haskell

Sources:

Haskell blocked five Nebraska punts, and rode the favorable field position to a 16–5 victory.

References

Nebraska
Nebraska Cornhuskers football seasons
Nebraska Cornhuskers football